Abisara intermedia, the plain Judy, is a butterfly in the family Riodinidae. It is found in Ghana, southern Nigeria, Cameroon, Angola and the Democratic Republic of the Congo. The habitat consists of dense forests.

References

Butterflies described in 1895
Abisara
Butterflies of Africa